Plymouth Marjon Cannons was an English amateur basketball team based in Plymouth, Devon. Following a merger between Cannons and Plymouth Raiders II (the reserve team of Plymouth Raiders) in 2009, the club rebranded as Plymouth Marjon and continue to field men's and women's teams in the English Basketball League.

The club was founded as Tamar Valley Cannons in 2000, named after the nearby River Tamar and its valley, dividing the counties of Devon and Cornwall. In 2007, the club changed its name to Plymouth Marjon Cannons after moving to the College of St Mark & St John (often abbreviated to Marjon) and becoming a part of its "Hub Club", operating a development system in partnership with the college.

Home arenas
Mayflower Centre (2000-2007)
Marjon Campus (2007-2009)

See also
University of St Mark & St John (formerly the College of St Mark & St John)
Plymouth Marjon

External links
Official Plymouth Marjon Cannons website
College of St. Mark & St John

Sport in Plymouth, Devon
Defunct basketball teams in the United Kingdom